Lentzea flava is a bacterium from the genus Lentzea which has been isolated from soil. Lentzea flava produces madumycin.

References

Pseudonocardiales
Bacteria described in 1974